The Dan Patch Line Bridge is a railroad swing bridge that carries the Canadian Pacific Railway's MN&S Subdivision across the Minnesota River in the U.S. state of Minnesota.  The MN&S Subdivision originated as the Minneapolis, St. Paul, Rochester and Dubuque Electric Traction Company, more commonly known as the Dan Patch Lines.  Today's name for the rail line comes from the Minneapolis, Northfield and Southern Railroad, which took over the Dan Patch route after the original railroad fell into bankruptcy.  Despite being met by Canadian Pacific rails at either end, the bridge itself is owned by the Twin Cities and Western Railroad which has trackage rights on the CP line to the north.  The TC&W purchased the bridge in order to protect a route that may become important in the future.

Early history
The bridge was built by Marion W. Savage, owner of the racehorse Dan Patch as part of a railroad extending from Minneapolis to Northfield. In the late 1970s, the highway portion of the bridge was closed because the Minneapolis, Northfield, and Southern wanted to raise the rental fees charged for use of the highway portion. The fees were requested to help pay for maintenance costs, because the bridge was suffering from deterioration caused by road salting in the winter. The traffic deck was removed in the 1980s. The road side of the bridge carried CSAH-34 (Normandale Road on the north side, and Vernon Road on the south side). By the time the Soo Line acquired the MN&S in 1982, the bridge had been under water four times during Minnesota River floods and been often struck by barges. The bridge's approach spans were basically sound, but the main span was showing the effects of the barge strikes, as well as shifting of its piers, advanced localized corrosion, and general wear on the swing span's gears and turning machinery. By 1982, all trains would stop before proceeding over the bridge at slow speed. The Soo Line concluded that the span would require slow speed restrictions unless "substantial maintenance" was done on the bridge. Twin Cities & Western began operating over the northern section of the former MN&S in 1996. Shortly after commencing these operations, the railroad upgraded the Dan Patch Line bridge in order to begin operations to Savage. Due to a downturn in the Minnesota River market, TC&W last used the bridge in 2007, but it retained ownership.

Current status
Under the 2010 Minnesota State Rail Plan, the Dan Patch Line Bridge would be replaced with a new one track bridge that would cost around $34 million.

In 2015, it was reported that TC&W planned to repair the bridge and resume direct rail access to the Post Savage terminals along the south banks of Minnesota River. The city of Savage subsequently announced a study to examine a new road crossing at the bridge.  TC&W is supportive of a new road crossing, but the city of Bloomington is not. In 2016, it was announced that the bridge was being reopened for use due to an expected surge in grain traffic, with the bridge to see approximately one grain train per day. However rail service to the Port of Savage via the Dan Patch Line Bridge has not begun as of 2023. Twin Cities & Western continues to transport grain to the rail yards in St. Paul for interchange with Union Pacific, and Union Pacific transports the rest of the way to Savage via the Mankato Subdivision. The TC&W system map, however, shows the railroad as serving Savage from the north.

References

Bibliography 
 

1908 establishments in Minnesota
Bridges completed in 1908
Bridges over the Minnesota River
Former road bridges in Minnesota
Swing bridges in the United States